Eternal Devastation is the second full-length album by German thrash metal band Destruction, released on July 12, 1986. 

It showed that the band, while still rooted in the speed metal/proto-black metal-influenced style of material evident on the Sentence of Death EP and Infernal Overkill, had started moving in the direction of a more contemporary thrash metal style.

This is the last studio album to feature drummer Thomas "Tommy" Sandmann, who left the band later in 1986 and was replaced by Oliver "Olli" Kaiser.

The album was re-released on June 12, 2017.

Track listing

Credits 
Writing, performance and production credits are adapted from the album liner notes.

Personnel 
Destruction
 Schmier – bass, vocals
 Mike Sifringer – guitars
 Thomas "Tommy" Sandmann – drums

Production
 Manfred Neuner – production, engineering
 Bernd Steinwedel – mastering

Artwork and design
 Sebastian Krüger – cover painting
 Joachim Peters – photography

Studios 
 Studio Hilpotstein – recording, mixing
 Studio Nord – mastering

References

External links 
 

1986 albums
Destruction (band) albums
SPV/Steamhammer albums